The 1929 Utah State Aggies football team was an American football team that represented Utah State Agricultural College in the Rocky Mountain Conference (RMC) during the 1929 college football season. In their 11th season under head coach Dick Romney, the Aggies compiled a 3–4 record (3–4 against RMC opponents), finished ninth in the conference, and were outscored by a total of 60 to 50.

Schedule

References

Utah State
Utah State Aggies football seasons
Utah State Aggies football